WMIK-FM is a radio station in Middlesboro, Kentucky along with its flagship station, WMIK-AM. At 92.7 FM and AM 560 it broadcasts 24 hours a day.

Originally owned by the Cumberland Gap Broadcasting Company, Incorporated, the station went on the air in 1971 only after years of trying to procure a license. In the early years the station played easy listening, and elevator music. The oldies format began in 1974 and the Oldies Channel continued until the station was sold 1992.  The station was at one time affiliated with the United Press International Radio Network (UPI) and later the National Broadcasting Company Radio Network (NBC).

The Binghamtown Baptist Church, under the direction from the Holy Spirit, through Gateway Broadcasting Corporation purchased WMIK-AM and WMIK-FM in October 1992. Both stations continue to serve the Cumberland Gap region twenty four hours a day with a variety of conservative religious programming, a mixture of local and nationally known ministers, Southern Gospel music, and local programming. WMIK-FM's news source is the Salem Radio Network (SRN).

Some of WMIK's most popular shows include Reaching Out with Dr. William Boyd Bingham III, Turning Points with Dr. David Jeremiah, Love Worth Finding with Dr. Adrian Rogers, and The Family Altar Program with Dr. Lester Roloff.

WMIK-FM was granted a construction permit for a power increase in March 2011 by the Federal Communications Commission and has increased power to 350 watts ERP with antenna 410 meters height above average terrain. The change now equates WMIK-FM to a Class A, 6000 watt facility. The stations transmitter site is atop White Oak Spur, the highest point in Bell County Kentucky. WMIK-FM is located in the landmark 1948 studios on North 19th Street in Middlesboro.

External links
WMIK Radio website

 The Cumberland Gap Broadcasting Company 1945-1992

MIK
Radio stations established in 1971
1971 establishments in Kentucky
Middlesboro, Kentucky